The St. Louis Cardinals 1996 season was the team's 115th season in St. Louis, Missouri and the 105th season in the National League.  It was Tony La Russa's first season managing the club, after leaving the Oakland Athletics. During the first year of the William DeWitt, Jr. era, the Cardinals went 88-74 during the season and won their first-ever National League Central division title by six games over the Houston Astros. They beat the San Diego Padres in the NLDS, but fell in 7 games to the Atlanta Braves in the NLCS after being up 3–1.  DeWitt, along with Drew Bauer and Fred Hanser had bought the Cardinals from Anheuser-Busch  during the 1995-96 offseason.

Offseason
 December 23, 1995: Ron Gant was signed as a free agent with the St. Louis Cardinals 
 December 23, 1995: Andy Benes was signed as a free agent with the St. Louis Cardinals 
 December 15, 1995: Willie McGee was signed as a free agent with the St. Louis Cardinals.
 January 9, 1996: Todd Stottlemyre was traded by the Oakland Athletics to the St. Louis Cardinals for Allen Battle, Carl Dale, Jay Witasick, and Bret Wagner (minors).
 January 11, 1996: Mike Gallego signed as a free agent with the St. Louis Cardinals.
 February 13, 1996: Dennis Eckersley was traded by the Oakland Athletics to the St. Louis Cardinals for Steve Montgomery.
 December 18, 1995: Gary Gaetti signed as a free agent with the St. Louis Cardinals.

Ozzie Smith's final season
Legendary veteran shortstop Ozzie Smith, announced during the season that it would be his last season in the Major Leagues, while veteran outfielder Willie McGee, was brought back to the Cards as a free agent. Though the tension between Smith and exciting youngster Royce Clayton, acquired in a trade, grew thick and troublesome at times as they shared time at shortstop, both players had good seasons. McGee came off the bench and started when needed.

Regular season

Season standings

Record vs. opponents

Game log

|- bgcolor="ffbbbb"
| 1 || April 1 || @ Mets || 6–7 || Dipoto || Fossas (0–1) || Franco || 42,060 || 0–1
|- bgcolor="ccffcc"
| 2 || April 3 || @ Mets || 5–3 || Stottlemyre (1–0) || Person || Eckersley (1) || 13,323 || 1–1
|- bgcolor="ffbbbb"
| 3 || April 4 || @ Mets || 9–10 || Franco || Eckersley (0–1) || — || 15,507 || 1–2
|- bgcolor="ccffcc"
| 4 || April 5 || @ Braves || 5–4 (14) || Bailey (1–0) || Bielecki || Eckersley (2) || 31,071 || 2–2
|- bgcolor="ccffcc"
| 5 || April 6 || @ Braves || 3–2 (12) || Parrett (1–0) || Clontz || — || 34,649 || 3–2
|- bgcolor="ffbbbb"
| 6 || April 7 || @ Braves || 3–13 || Schmidt || Busby (0–1) || — || 28,498 || 3–3
|- bgcolor="ffbbbb"
| 7 || April 8 || Expos || 3–4 (10) || Rojas || Parrett (1–1) || — || 52,841 || 3–4
|- bgcolor="ccffcc"
| 8 || April 10 || Expos || 4–1 || Benes (1–0) || Paniagua || — || 27,734 || 4–4
|- bgcolor="ccffcc"
| 9 || April 11 || Phillies || 2–1 || Benes (2–0) || Mulholland || Mathews (1) || 23,412 || 5–4
|- bgcolor="ccffcc"
| 10 || April 12 || Phillies || 6–1 || Urbani (1–0) || Williams || — || 26,753 || 6–4
|- bgcolor="ffbbbb"
| 11 || April 13 || Phillies || 2–4 || Hunter || Fossas (0–2) || Bottalico || 28,913 || 6–5
|- bgcolor="ccffcc"
| 12 || April 14 || Phillies || 6–5 || Mathews (1–0) || Fernandez || Eckersley (3) || 27,545 || 7–5
|- bgcolor="ccffcc"
| 13 || April 15 || Pirates || 6–4 || Benes (3–0) || Ericks || Honeycutt (1) || 18,731 || 8–5
|- bgcolor="ffbbbb"
| 14 || April 16 || Pirates || 3–13 || Smith || Benes (3–1) || Lieber || 21,349 || 8–6
|- bgcolor="ccffcc"
| 15 || April 17 || Pirates || 6–1 || Osborne (1–0) || Darwin || — || 23,074 || 9–6
|- bgcolor="ffbbbb"
| 16 || April 18 || Pirates || 2–6 || Wagner || Stottlemyre (1–1) || — || 25,700 || 9–7
|- bgcolor="ccffcc"
| 17 || April 19 || @ Phillies || 1–0 || Bailey (2–0) || Springer || Eckersley (4) || 25,614 || 10–7
|- bgcolor="ccffcc"
| 18 || April 20 || @ Phillies || 1–0 || Benes (4–1) || Bottalico || Eckersley (5) || 23,630 || 11–7
|- bgcolor="ffbbbb"
| 19 || April 21 || @ Phillies || 2–4 || Grace || Benes (4–2) || Bottalico || 32,896 || 11–8
|- bgcolor="ffbbbb"
| 20 || April 22 || @ Expos || 0–8 || Cormier || Osborne (1–1) || — || 9,778 || 11–9
|- bgcolor="ffbbbb"
| 21 || April 23 || @ Expos || 11–12 || Scott || Mathews (1–1) || — || 8,352 || 11–10
|- bgcolor="ccffcc"
| 22 || April 24 || Mets || 9–4 || Petkovsek (1–0) || Harnisch || — || 23,189 || 12–10
|- bgcolor="ffbbbb"
| 23 || April 25 || Mets || 3–9 || Clark || Benes (4–3) || — || 26,933 || 12–11
|- bgcolor="ffbbbb"
| 24 || April 26 || Braves || 1–6 || Avery || Benes (4–4) || — || 34,598 || 12–12
|- bgcolor="ffbbbb"
| 25 || April 27 || Braves || 2–7 || Maddux || Osborne (1–2) || — || 20,757 || 12–13
|- bgcolor="ffbbbb"
| 26 || April 29 || Braves || 1–4 || Glavine || Stottlemyre (1–2) || Wohlers || 25,452 || 12–14
|- bgcolor="ffbbbb"
| 27 || April 30 || @ Cubs || 6–7 || Wendell || Eckersley (0–2) || — || 20,771 || 12–15
|-

|- bgcolor="ffbbbb"
| 28 || May 1 || @ Cubs || 3–9 || Trachsel || Benes (4–5) || — || 25,668 || 12–16
|- bgcolor="ccffcc"
| 29 || May 3 || @ Padres || 3–1 || Osborne (2–2) || Ashby || Eckersley (6) || 21,335 || 13–16
|- bgcolor="ccffcc"
| 30 || May 4 || @ Padres || 4–3 || Stottlemyre (2–2) || Bergman || Eckersley (7) || 44,375 || 14–16
|- bgcolor="ffbbbb"
| 31 || May 5 || @ Padres || 4–10 || Hamilton || Benes (4–6) || — || 27,435 || 14–17
|- bgcolor="ffbbbb"
| 32 || May 7 || Giants || 2–4 || Watson || Fossas (0–3) || Beck || 23,492 || 14–18
|- bgcolor="ffbbbb"
| 33 || May 8 || Giants || 7–10 || Gardner || Benes (4–7) || Beck || 22,517 || 14–19
|- bgcolor="ccffcc"
| 34 || May 9 || Giants || 16–8 || Parrett (2–1) || Dewey || — || 37,920 || 15–19
|- bgcolor="ffbbbb"
| 35 || May 10 || Dodgers || 2–3 (12) || Worrell || Eckersley (0–3) || — || 36,821 || 15–20
|- bgcolor="ffbbbb"
| 36 || May 11 || Dodgers || 2–4 || Valdez || Benes (4–8) || Worrell || 38,008 || 15–21
|- bgcolor="ccffcc"
| 37 || May 12 || Dodgers || 6–5 || Petkovsek (2–0) || Nomo || Eckersley (8) || 38,549 || 16–21
|- bgcolor="ffbbbb"
| 38 || May 13 || @ Marlins || 2–5 || Burkett || Benes (4–9) || Powell || 19,227 || 16–22
|- bgcolor="ffbbbb"
| 39 || May 14 || @ Marlins || 5–11 || Mathews || Parrett (2–2) || — || 16,070 || 16–23
|- bgcolor="ccffcc"
| 40 || May 15 || @ Marlins || 6–0 || Stottlemyre (3–2) || Rapp || — || 18,066 || 17–23
|- bgcolor="ffbbbb"
| 41 || May 17 || @ Rockies || 11–12 || Leskanic || Bailey (2–1) || Ruffin || 48,074 || 17–24
|- bgcolor="ffbbbb"
| 42 || May 18 || @ Rockies || 8–9 || Habyan || Eckersley (0–4) || — || 48,103 || 17–25
|- bgcolor="ffbbbb"
| 43 || May 19 || @ Rockies || 3–10 || Thompson || Benes (4–10) || — || 48,075 || 17–26
|- bgcolor="ccffcc"
| 44 || May 20 || @ Astros || 5–3 || Osborne (3–2) || Drabek || — || 14,547 || 18–26
|- bgcolor="ccffcc"
| 45 || May 21 || @ Astros || 8–2 || Stottlemyre (4–2) || Reynolds || — || 17,935 || 19–26
|- bgcolor="ccffcc"
| 46 || May 22 || @ Astros || 5–2 || Benes (5–10) || Kile || Mathews (2) || 15,353 || 20–26
|- bgcolor="ccffcc"
| 47 || May 24 || @ Marlins || 4–2 || Morgan (1–0) || Burkett || Mathews (3) || 19,583 || 21–26
|- bgcolor="ccffcc"
| 48 || May 25 || @ Marlins || 5–0 || Benes (6–10) || Rapp || — || 26,312 || 22–26
|- bgcolor="ffbbbb"
| 49 || May 26 || @ Marlins || 2–8 (7) || Weathers || Osborne (3–3) || — || 20,573 || 22–27
|- bgcolor="ffbbbb"
| 50 || May 27 || Rockies || 2–5 || Ritz || Stottlemyre (4–3) || Ruffin || 38,804 || 22–28
|- bgcolor="ffbbbb"
| 51 || May 28 || Rockies || 5–6 || Painter || Mathews (1–2) || Holmes || 26,913 || 22–29
|- bgcolor="ccffcc"
| 52 || May 29 || Rockies || 6–5 || Petkovsek (3–0) || Leskanic || Benes (1) || 27,856 || 23–29
|- bgcolor="ccffcc"
| 53 || May 31 || Astros || 6–4 || Osborne (4–3) || Swindell || Fossas (1) || 37,625 || 24–29
|-

|- bgcolor="ccffcc"
| 54 || June 1 || Astros || 5–4 (10) || Bailey (3–1) || Hernandez || — || 34,958 || 25–29
|- bgcolor="ccffcc"
| 55 || June 2 || Astros || 2–0 || Stottlemyre (5–3) || Kile || — || 32,703 || 26–29
|- bgcolor="ccffcc"
| 56 || June 3 || @ Padres || 3–0 || Benes (7–10) || Tewksbury || — || 13,625 || 27–29
|- bgcolor="ccffcc"
| 57 || June 4 || @ Padres || 11–5 || Petkovsek (4–0) || Worrell || — || 13,427 || 28–29
|- bgcolor="ffbbbb"
| 58 || June 5 || @ Padres || 4–6 || Hoffman || Fossas (0–4) || — || 12,216 || 28–30
|- bgcolor="ccffcc"
| 59 || June 7 || @ Giants || 9–4 || Benes (8–10) || Fernandez || — || 13,009 || 29–30
|- bgcolor="ffbbbb"
| 60 || June 8 || @ Giants || 1–4 || DeLucia || Stottlemyre (5–4) || Beck || 20,401 || 29–31
|- bgcolor="ffbbbb"
| 61 || June 9 || @ Giants || 0–9 || Watson || Benes (8–11) || — || 24,176 || 29–32
|- bgcolor="ffbbbb"
| 62 || June 10 || @ Dodgers || 1–2 || Park || Morgan (1–1) || Osuna || 54,043 || 29–33
|- bgcolor="ccffcc"
| 63 || June 11 || @ Dodgers || 6–3 || Osborne (5–3) || Martinez || Honeycutt (2) || 29,096 || 30–33
|- bgcolor="ffbbbb"
| 64 || June 13 || Mets || 1–2 || Person || Benes (8–12) || Henry || 30,697 || 30–34
|- bgcolor="ccffcc"
| 65 || June 14 || Mets || 13–4 || Stottlemyre (6–4) || Isringhausen || — || 38,556 || 31–34
|- bgcolor="ccffcc"
| 66 || June 15 || Mets || 4–2 || Benes (9–12) || Jones || Eckersley (9) || 50,635 || 32–34
|- bgcolor="ccffcc"
| 67 || June 16 || Mets || 5–4 || Petkovsek (5–0) || Henry || Eckersley (10) || 31,375 || 33–34
|- bgcolor="ccffcc"
| 68 || June 18 || Phillies || 3–2 || Osborne (6–3) || Fernandez || Eckersley (11) || 31,311 || 34–34
|- bgcolor="ccffcc"
| 69 || June 19 || Phillies || 3–2 || Benes (10–12) || Bottalico || — || 34,612 || 35–34
|- bgcolor="ffbbbb"
| 70 || June 20 || @ Expos || 3–8 || Rueter || Stottlemyre (6–5) || — || 15,095 || 35–35
|- bgcolor="ffbbbb"
| 71 || June 21 || @ Expos || 3–4 (12) || Rojas || Eckersley (0–5) || — || 16,136 || 35–36
|- bgcolor="ccffcc"
| 72 || June 22 || @ Expos || 9–4 || Morgan (2–1) || Urbina || — || 16,895 || 36–36
|- bgcolor="ffbbbb"
| 73 || June 23 || @ Expos || 2–3 || Fassero || Osborne (6–4) || Rojas || 22,168 || 36–37
|- bgcolor="ccffcc"
| 74 || June 24 || @ Braves || 9–2 || Benes (11–12) || Smoltz || — || 31,971 || 37–37
|- bgcolor="ffbbbb"
| 75 || June 25 || @ Braves || 3–4 || Schmidt || Stottlemyre (6–6) || Wohlers || 30,942 || 37–38
|- bgcolor="ccffcc"
| 76 || June 26 || @ Braves || 11–7 || Benes (12–12) || Avery || — || 31,191 || 38–38
|- bgcolor="ffbbbb"
| 77 || June 27 || @ Braves || 0–3 || Maddux || Morgan (2–2) || Wohlers || 32,243 || 38–39
|- bgcolor="ccffcc"
| 78 || June 28 || Pirates || 6–1 || Osborne (7–4) || Neagle || — || 34,490 || 39–39
|- bgcolor="ccffcc"
| 79 || June 29 || Pirates || 6–5 || Honeycutt (1–0) || Miceli || — || 34,426 || 40–39
|- bgcolor="ccffcc"
| 80 || June 30 || Pirates || 10–3 || Stottlemyre (7–6) || Smith || — || 38,901 || 41–39
|-

|- bgcolor="ffbbbb"
| 81 || July 1 || Reds || 5–8 || Carrasco || Benes (12–13) || Brantley || 27,221 || 41–40
|- bgcolor="ccffcc"
| 82 || July 2 || Reds || 4–3 || Honeycutt (2–0) || Smith || Eckersley (12) || 29,074 || 42–40
|- bgcolor="ccffcc"
| 83 || July 3 || Reds || 4–0 || Osborne (8–4) || Smiley || — || 32,658 || 43–40
|- bgcolor="ccffcc"
| 84 || July 4 || @ Pirates || 7–1 || Benes (13–13) || Dessens || — || 23,321 || 44–40
|- bgcolor="ccffcc"
| 85 || July 5 || @ Pirates || 7–4 || Stottlemyre (8–6) || Smith || Fossas (2) || 18,759 || 45–40
|- bgcolor="ccffcc"
| 86 || July 6 || @ Pirates || 9–5 || Benes (14–13) || Darwin || — || 19,144 || 46–40
|- bgcolor="ffbbbb"
| 87 || July 7 || @ Pirates || 2–8 || Lieber || Morgan (2–3) || — || 16,255 || 46–41
|- bgcolor="ffbbbb"
| 88 || July 11 || @ Cubs || 0–6 || Navarro || Osborne (8–5) || — || 38,802 || 46–42
|- bgcolor="ccffcc"
| 89 || July 12 || @ Cubs || 13–3 || Benes (15–13) || Trachsel || — || 38,918 || 47–42
|- bgcolor="ccffcc"
| 90 || July 13 || @ Cubs || 10–5 || Stottlemyre (9–6) || Bullinger || Eckersley (13) || 39,254 || 48–42
|- bgcolor="ccffcc"
| 91 || July 14 || @ Cubs || 7–6 || Benes (16–13) || Adams || Eckersley (14) || 38,638 || 49–42
|- bgcolor="ccffcc"
| 92 || July 15 || @ Reds || 8–3 || Morgan (3–3) || Salkeld || — || 38,450 || 50–42
|- bgcolor="ccffcc"
| 93 || July 16 || @ Reds || 5–4 || Osborne (9–5) || Shaw || Eckersley (15) || 23,370 || 51–42
|- bgcolor="ccffcc"
| 94 || July 17 || @ Reds || 6–4 || Benes (17–13) || Portugal || Eckersley (16) || 28,879 || 52–42
|- bgcolor="ffbbbb"
| 95 || July 18 || Cubs || 5–6 || Bottenfield || Petkovsek (5–1) || Wendell || 38,983 || 52–43
|- bgcolor="ccffcc"
| 96 || July 19 || Cubs || 9–1 || Benes (18–13) || Castillo || — || 45,336 || 53–43
|- bgcolor="ffbbbb"
| 97 || July 20 || Cubs || 0–3 || Trachsel || Morgan (3–4) || Wendell || 50,418 || 53–44
|- bgcolor="ccffcc"
| 98 || July 21 || Cubs || 6–5 (10) || Petkovsek (6–1) || Wendell || — || 42,257 || 54–44
|- bgcolor="ffbbbb"
| 99 || July 22 || Braves || 6–8 || McMichael || Mathews (1–3) || Wohlers || 36,215 || 54–45
|- bgcolor="ffbbbb"
| 100 || July 23 || Braves || 2–3 || Smoltz || Stottlemyre (9–7) || Wohlers || 35,520 || 54–46
|- bgcolor="ffbbbb"
| 101 || July 24 || Braves || 1–4 || Wade || Benes (18–14) || McMichael || 35,411 || 54–47
|- bgcolor="ffbbbb"
| 102 || July 25 || Expos || 2–4 || Urbina || Petkovsek (6–2) || Rojas || 34,271 || 54–48
|- bgcolor="ffbbbb"
| 103 || July 26 || Expos || 1–5 || Fassero || Osborne (9–6) || — || 30,048 || 54–49
|- bgcolor="ccffcc"
| 104 || July 27 || Expos || 6–3 || Benes (19–14) || Dyer || Eckersley (17) || 44,269 || 55–49
|- bgcolor="ccffcc"
| 105 || July 28 || Expos || 6–4 || Petkovsek (7–2) || Martinez || Mathews (4) || 31,226 || 56–49
|- bgcolor="ffbbbb"
| 106 || July 30 || @ Phillies || 7–8 || Ryan || Mathews (1–4) || — || 20,166 || 56–50
|-

|- bgcolor="ffbbbb"
| 107 || August 1 || @ Phillies || 1–2 || Springer || Osborne (9–7) || Ryan || — || 56–51
|- bgcolor="ccffcc"
| 108 || August 1 || @ Phillies || 7–1 || Benes (20–14) || Mimbs || — || 22,934 || 57–51
|- bgcolor="ccffcc"
| 109 || August 2 || @ Mets || 4–3 || Stottlemyre (10–7) || Jones || Honeycutt (3) || 34,091 || 58–51
|- bgcolor="ffbbbb"
| 110 || August 3 || @ Mets || 4–5 || Harnisch || Benes (20–15) || Franco || 28,594 || 58–52
|- bgcolor="ccffcc"
| 111 || August 4 || @ Mets || 4–2 || Morgan (4–4) || Isringhausen || Eckersley (18) || 24,595 || 59–52
|- bgcolor="ccffcc"
| 112 || August 5 || Padres || 8–2 || Benes (21–15) || Tewksbury || — || 28,653 || 60–52
|- bgcolor="ffbbbb"
| 113 || August 6 || Padres || 0–1 || Worrell || Osborne (9–8) || Hoffman || 25,782 || 60–53
|- bgcolor="ccffcc"
| 114 || August 7 || Padres || 1–0 || Petkovsek (8–2) || Bochtler || — || 24,823 || 61–53
|- bgcolor="ffbbbb"
| 115 || August 8 || Giants || 3–5 (10) || Poole || Honeycutt (2–1) || Beck || 34,844 || 61–54
|- bgcolor="ffbbbb"
| 116 || August 9 || Giants || 6–8 || Fernandez || Morgan (4–5) || Beck || 30,118 || 61–55
|- bgcolor="ccffcc"
| 117 || August 10 || Giants || 7–1 || Benes (22–15) || VanLandingham || — || 49,344 || 62–55
|- bgcolor="ccffcc"
| 118 || August 11 || Giants || 5–3 || Osborne (10–8) || Watson || Eckersley (19) || 30,139 || 63–55
|- bgcolor="ffbbbb"
| 119 || August 13 || Dodgers || 4–8 || Candiotti || Stottlemyre (10–8) || — || 30,761 || 63–56
|- bgcolor="ccffcc"
| 120 || August 14 || Dodgers || 6–1 || Benes (23–15) || Valdez || — || 26,945 || 64–56
|- bgcolor="ffbbbb"
| 121 || August 15 || Dodgers || 2–5 || Nomo || Morgan (4–6) || Worrell || 32,930 || 64–57
|- bgcolor="ccffcc"
| 122 || August 16 || Marlins || 6–2 || Benes (24–15) || Rapp || — || 30,507 || 65–57
|- bgcolor="ccffcc"
| 123 || August 17 || Marlins || 4–3 || Mathews (2–4) || Powell || Eckersley (20) || 30,792 || 66–57
|- bgcolor="ccffcc"
| 124 || August 18 || Marlins || 5–3 || Stottlemyre (11–8) || Leiter || Eckersley (21) || 34,564 || 67–57
|- bgcolor="ffbbbb"
| 125 || August 20 || @ Rockies || 4–5 (13) || Munoz || Mathews (2–5) || — || 48,126 || 67–58
|- bgcolor="ffbbbb"
| 126 || August 21 || @ Rockies || 2–10 || Reynoso || Benes (24–16) || — || 48,045 || 67–59
|- bgcolor="ffbbbb"
| 127 || August 22 || @ Rockies || 5–10 || Bailey || Morgan (4–7) || — || 48,086 || 67–60
|- bgcolor="ccffcc"
| 128 || August 23 || @ Astros || 1–0 || Osborne (11–8) || Kile || Eckersley (22) || 35,554 || 68–60
|- bgcolor="ffbbbb"
| 129 || August 24 || @ Astros || 1–3 || Reynolds || Stottlemyre (11–9) || — || 43,258 || 68–61
|- bgcolor="ffbbbb"
| 130 || August 25 || @ Astros || 1–4 || Wall || Benes (24–17) || Hernandez || 31,609 || 68–62
|- bgcolor="ccffcc"
| 131 || August 26 || @ Astros || 3–2 || Benes (25–17) || Hampton || Eckersley (23) || 21,624 || 69–62
|- bgcolor="ffbbbb"
| 132 || August 27 || Marlins || 3–6 || Hutton || Morgan (4–8) || Nen || 24,784 || 69–63
|- bgcolor="ffbbbb"
| 133 || August 28 || Marlins || 2–3 (10) || Hammond || Bailey (3–2) || Nen || 21,767 || 69–64
|- bgcolor="ffbbbb"
| 134 || August 29 || Marlins || 9–10 || Leiter || Stottlemyre (11–10) || Nen || 23,105 || 69–65
|- bgcolor="ccffcc"
| 135 || August 30 || Rockies || 7–4 || Benes (26–17) || Wright || Eckersley (24) || 25,530 || 70–65
|- bgcolor="ccffcc"
| 136 || August 31 || Rockies || 2–1 || Benes (27–17) || Bailey || Eckersley (25) || 35,804 || 71–65
|-

|- bgcolor="ccffcc"
| 137 || September 1 || Rockies || 15–6 || Petkovsek (9–2) || Rekar || — || 28,552 || 72–65
|- bgcolor="ccffcc"
| 138 || September 2 || Astros || 8–7 (10) || Benes (28–17) || Brocail || — || 32,955 || 73–65
|- bgcolor="ccffcc"
| 139 || September 3 || Astros || 12–3 || Stottlemyre (12–10) || Reynolds || — || 23,955 || 74–65
|- bgcolor="ccffcc"
| 140 || September 4 || Astros || 6–4 || Benes (29–17) || Wall || Eckersley (26) || 34,891 || 75–65
|- bgcolor="ccffcc"
| 141 || September 6 || Padres || 8–3 || Petkovsek (10–2) || Tewksbury || — || 28,116 || 76–65
|- bgcolor="ccffcc"
| 142 || September 7 || Padres || 8–3 || Osborne (12–8) || Ashby || — || 42,846 || 77–65
|- bgcolor="ffbbbb"
| 143 || September 8 || Padres || 4–5 || Valenzuela || Stottlemyre (12–11) || Hoffman || 30,897 || 77–66
|- bgcolor="ccffcc"
| 144 || September 9 || @ Giants || 6–2 || Benes (30–17) || Gardner || — || 10,307 || 78–66
|- bgcolor="ccffcc"
| 145 || September 10 || @ Giants || 1–0 || Petkovsek (11–2) || Rueter || Eckersley (27) || 8,770 || 79–66
|- bgcolor="ffbbbb"
| 146 || September 11 || @ Giants || 2–4 || Scott || Benes (30–18) || Beck || 9,673 || 79–67
|- bgcolor="ffbbbb"
| 147 || September 12 || @ Dodgers || 1–4 || Nomo || Osborne (12–9) || Osuna || 34,191 || 79–68
|- bgcolor="ccffcc"
| 148 || September 13 || @ Dodgers || 2–0 || Batchelor (1–0) || Guthrie || Eckersley (28) || 36,657 || 80–68
|- bgcolor="ffbbbb"
| 149 || September 14 || @ Dodgers || 5–9 || Martinez || Benes (30–19) || — || 44,548 || 80–69
|- bgcolor="ffbbbb"
| 150 || September 15 || @ Dodgers || 5–6 || Radinsky || Eckersley (0–6) || Worrell || 35,803 || 80–70
|- bgcolor="ccffcc"
| 151 || September 17 || Cubs || 5–3 || Osborne (13–9) || Patterson || Mathews (5) || 29,612 || 81–70
|- bgcolor="ccffcc"
| 152 || September 18 || Cubs || 5–3 || Stottlemyre (13–11) || Trachsel || Eckersley (29) || 32,843 || 82–70
|- bgcolor="ccffcc"
| 153 || September 19 || Cubs || 5–4 (13) || Bailey (4–2) || Campbell || — || 34,923 || 83–70
|- bgcolor="ffbbbb"
| 154 || September 20 || @ Reds || 2–4 || Burba || Benes (30–20) || Brantley || 23,496 || 83–71
|- bgcolor="ffbbbb"
| 155 || September 22 || @ Reds || 3–6 || Shaw || Mathews (2–6) || Brantley || — || 83–72
|- bgcolor="ffbbbb"
| 156 || September 22 || @ Reds || 0–6 || Smiley || Jackson (0–1) || — || 38,225 || 83–73
|- bgcolor="ccffcc"
| 157 || September 23 || @ Reds || 3–2 || Stottlemyre (14–11) || Morgan || Eckersley (30) || 17,313 || 84–73
|- bgcolor="ccffcc"
| 158 || September 24 || @ Pirates || 7–1 || Benes (31–20) || Loaiza || — || 8,611 || 85–73
|- bgcolor="ccffcc"
| 159 || September 25 || @ Pirates || 8–7 (11) || Bailey (5–2) || Miceli || Mathews (6) || 20,022 || 86–73
|- bgcolor="ccffcc"
| 160 || September 27 || Reds || 2–1 (11) || Batchelor (2–0) || Shaw || — || 39,730 || 87–73
|- bgcolor="ccffcc"
| 161 || September 28 || Reds || 5–2 || Jackson (1–1) || Morgan || Honeycutt (4) || 52,876 || 88–73
|- bgcolor="ffbbbb"
| 162 || September 29 || Reds || 3–6 || Lyons || Ludwick (0–1) || Brantley || 51,379 || 88–74
|-

|-
| Legend:       = Win       = LossBold = Cardinals team member

Detailed records

Opening Day starters
 Luis Alicea
 Gary Gaetti
 Ron Gant
 Ray Lankford
 John Mabry
 Willie McGee
 Pat Borders
 Ozzie Smith
 Todd Stottlemyre

Roster

Player stats

Batting

Starters by position 
Note: Pos = Position; G = Games played; AB = At bats; H = Hits; Avg. = Batting average; HR = Home runs; RBI = Runs batted in

Other batters 
Note: G = Games played; AB = At bats; H = Hits; Avg. = Batting average; HR = Home runs; RBI = Runs batted in

Pitching

Starting pitchers 
Note: G = Games pitched; IP = Innings pitched; W = Wins; L = Losses; ERA = Earned run average; SO = Strikeouts

Other pitchers 
Note: G = Games pitched; IP = Innings pitched; W = Wins; L = Losses; ERA = Earned run average; SO = Strikeouts

Relief pitchers 
Note: G = Games pitched; W = Wins; L = Losses; SV = Saves; ERA = Earned run average; SO = Strikeouts

NLDS

St. Louis wins the series, 3-0

NLCS

Game 1
October 9: Atlanta–Fulton County Stadium in Atlanta

Game 2
October 10: Atlanta–Fulton County Stadium in Atlanta

Game 3
October 12: Busch Stadium in St. Louis, Missouri

Game 4
October 13: Busch Stadium in St. Louis, Missouri

Game 5
October 14: Busch Stadium in St. Louis, Missouri

Game 6
October 16: Atlanta–Fulton County Stadium in Atlanta

Game 7
October 17: Atlanta–Fulton County Stadium in Atlanta

Awards and honors
 Tony La Russa, Associated Press Manager of the Year
 Ozzie Smith, All Star Game

Farm system

References

External links
1996 St. Louis Cardinals at Baseball Reference
1996 St. Louis Cardinals team page at www.baseball-almanac.com

St. Louis Cardinals seasons
National League Central champion seasons
Saint Louis Cardinals
St Lou